Neolochmaea is a genus of skeletonizing leaf beetles in the family Chrysomelidae. There are three described species in Neolochmaea. They are found in the Neotropics.

Species
The following species are described in the genus:
 Neolochmaea brevicornis 
 Neolochmaea dilatipennis 
 Neolochmaea guerini

References

Further reading

External links

 

Galerucinae
Chrysomelidae genera
Articles created by Qbugbot